The New Sudan Education Initiative (NESEI) is a non-profit organization based in Colchester, Vermont in the United States, which is building secondary schools (high schools) throughout South Sudan, a region affected by war for nearly half a century.  It was founded in January 2006 by Atem Deng, a former Sudanese refugee, and Robert Lair, a social entrepreneur and educator. The organization was created after a Comprehensive Peace Agreement was signed in 2005, bringing the conflict in southern Sudan to an official close. The CPA created a critical opportunity for development to take place in this region.  In 2004, Deng and Lair asked Sudanese they met at refugee camps throughout East Africa what was most needed in their homeland. "Education" was the resounding answer they received. South Sudan currently suffers from some of the worst education access rates in the world. Female illiteracy hovers above 93%, and only 5% of young people graduate from high school. It was from these discussions with Sudanese refugees that they developed NESEI. The organization opened its first school in May 2008, near the town of Yei, and it currently plans to build 20 schools throughout South Sudan.

History and present activities 
NESEI was first conceived in January 2004, on a plane ride from East Africa to Vermont, when Robert Lair, a faculty member at Saint Michael's College, and Atem Deng, a former Sudanese refugee and student at the University of Vermont, decided that they needed to make an impact in Southern Sudan, after witnessing the poor living conditions and lack of education opportunities affecting Sudanese in refugee camps across East Africa. They formulated a plan to work with the large Sudanese diaspora population in the Burlington, VT area and throughout the United States to bring diaspora-initiated education opportunities to Sudan. Together, they founded an organization, named the New Sudan Education Initiative (NESEI), through which they planned to provide an education for young people throughout Southern Sudan who lacked education opportunities, including former child soldiers, young women, Internally Displaced Persons (IDPs), and other groups who had been most adversely affected in the decades-long war there.

Over the next few years, their organization evolved into a plan to provide secondary education to 20,000 Southern Sudanese children and to build 20 schools throughout the region. Their first school, The New Sudan School of Health Sciences, opened on May 19, 2008, with an initial class of 75 young women.

NESEI has evolved into an organization that has as its priority the incorporation of sustainable economic and environmental practices at its school campus. To achieve this goal, they have instituted social business practices that include agriculturally based income generating projects that provide food to the campus and broader community. Additionally, the school plans to replace the generators which currently power the school with solar panels, increasing environmental and economic sustainability.

In 2010, NESEI was renamed Africa Education and Leadership Initiative.

Future plans 
NESEI's school plans to expand to over 100 students in 2009.  NESEI also plans to open an agriculture program within the next year at the same location, which will teach students agricultural practices in an 'interactive classroom' on the school farm.  As part of their studies, students will grow and learn about food at the farm, helping to support their campus and the surrounding communities.

NESEI plans to open schools throughout South Sudan. These schools will combine a standard high school curriculum, as well as specialized vocational courses, which will provide training to young Sudanese in specific occupations which are in high demand and low supply throughout South Sudan, including Health Sciences, Agriculture, Computer Technology, and Business.

Philosophical guidelines 
Although NESEI is currently a traditional non-profit organization, and receives most of its funding from private donors, it operates under the belief that a sustainable business model is one which will be most able to create a lasting and scalable impact. It believes that there is much to learn from the social entrepreneur movement, and plans to become a social business in the future, which will no longer have to rely on donations for its funding.  It plans to become sustainable through charging a small tuition to its more affluent students, and by utilizing income-generating projects in its schools.  The projects will include activities in each school, with examples being small agricultural plots and animal husbandry.  This will provide food for the school, teach students valuable skills, and supply the local community with reasonably priced and fresh products.

References 

Education in Sudan
Education in South Sudan
Charities based in Vermont
Child education organizations
Foreign charities operating in Sudan